The Midnight Judges Act (also known as the Judiciary Act of 1801; , and officially An act to provide for the more convenient organization of the Courts of the United States) represented an effort to solve an issue in the U.S. Supreme Court during the early 19th century.  There was concern, beginning in 1789, about the system that required the Justices of the Supreme Court to "ride circuit" and reiterate decisions made in the appellate level courts. The Supreme Court Justices had often expressed concern and suggested that the judges of the Supreme and circuit courts be divided.  The Act was repealed  by Congress on January 22, 1802.

Effect on judicial divisions and authority
The Act became law on February 13, 1801 and reduced the number of seats on the Supreme Court from 6 to 5, effective upon the next vacancy in the Court. No such vacancy occurred during the brief period the Act was in effect, so the size of the Court remained unchanged. The Act also created 16 new judgeships that John Adams rapidly began to fill in the last weeks of his presidency. These judges came to be known as the "Midnight Judges".

The Act reorganized the circuit courts, doubling them in number from three to six, and created three new circuit judgeships for each circuit (except the sixth, which received only one circuit judge). In addition to creating new lifetime posts for Federal judges, the circuit judgeships were intended to relieve the Justices of the Supreme Court from the hardships of riding circuit (that is, sitting as judges on the circuit courts). The circuit judge-ships were abolished in 1802, and the Justices continued to ride circuit until 1879.  One of the judges on the Supreme Court appointed by Adams was Chief Justice John Marshall.

The Act also reorganized the district courts, creating ten. These courts were to be presided over by the existing district judges in most cases. In addition to subdividing several of the existing district courts, it created the District of Ohio which covered the Northwest and Indiana Territories, and the District of Potomac from the District of Columbia and pieces of Maryland and Virginia, which was the first time a federal judicial district crossed state lines. However, the district courts for Kentucky and Tennessee were abolished, and their judges reassigned to the circuit courts.

In addition, it gave the circuit courts jurisdiction to hear "all cases in law or equity, arising under the constitution and laws of the United States, and treaties made, or which shall be made, under their authority." This form of jurisdiction, now known as federal question jurisdiction, had not previously been granted to the federal courts.

The Midnight Judges

In the 19 days between passage of this Act and the conclusion of his administration, President Adams quickly filled as many of the newly created circuit judgeships as possible. The new judges were known as the Midnight Judges because Adams was said to be signing their appointments at midnight prior to President Thomas Jefferson's inauguration. The famous Supreme Court case of Marbury v. Madison involved one of these "midnight" appointments, although it was an appointment of a justice of the peace for the District of Columbia—which was authorized under a different Act of Congress, not the Judiciary Act.

Attempts to solve this situation before and throughout the presidency of John Adams were overshadowed by more pressing foreign and domestic issues that occupied Congress during the early years of the nation's development.  None of those attempts to fix the situation facing the Supreme Court were successful until John Adams took control in 1797. Faced with the Election of 1800, a watershed moment in American history that represented not only the struggle to correctly organize the foundation of the United States government but also the culmination of struggle between the waning Federalist Party and the rising Democratic-Republican Party, John Adams successfully reorganized the nation's court system with the Judiciary Act of 1801.

The 1800 elections
During the 1800 elections, there was an intense growth of partisan politics, the political party of the executive branch of government changed for the first time, and there was an unprecedented peaceful transition of the political orientation of the country's leadership. The main issues in this election were taxes, the military, peace negotiations with France, and the Alien and Sedition Acts and Kentucky and Virginia Resolutions. The campaign leading up to this election and the election itself revealed sharp divisions within the Federalist Party. Alexander Hamilton and the extreme Federalists attacked Adams for his persistence for peace with France, his opposition to building an army, and his failure to enforce the Alien and Sedition Acts.

The results of this election favored Thomas Jefferson and Aaron Burr over Adams, but both Jefferson and Burr got 73 electoral votes. Presented with a tie, the House of Representatives, which was dominated by Federalists and led by Alexander Hamilton, eventually decided the election in favor of Thomas Jefferson. Democratic-Republicans also won control of the legislative branch of government after the congressional elections.

Jefferson was inaugurated on March 4, 1801 without the presence of Adams. Jefferson's inaugural address attempted to appease the Federalists by promising to maintain the strength of the federal government and to pay off the national debt. Jefferson spoke of dangerous "entangling alliances" with foreign countries as President George Washington had done before him, and made a plea for national unity claiming that "we are all republicans and we are all federalists." Once in office, Jefferson set out to rescind the Judiciary Act of 1801 and remove newly appointed Federalists.

Marbury v. Madison

The implications of Adams's actions in appointing Federalists to the Supreme Court and the federal courts, led to one of the most important decisions in American judicial history. Marbury v. Madison solidified the United States' system of checks and balances and gave the judicial branch equal power with the executive and legislative branches.  This controversial case began with Adams' appointment of Federalist William Marbury as a justice of the peace in the District of Columbia.  When the newly appointed Secretary of State James Madison refused to process Marbury's selection, Marbury requested a writ of mandamus, which would force Madison to make his appointment official.   Chief Justice John Marshall declared that the Supreme Court did not have the authority to force Madison to make the appointment official.  This statement actually challenged the Judiciary Act of 1789, which stated that the Supreme Court did, in fact, have the right to issue those writs.  Marshall, therefore, ruled that part of the Judiciary Act of 1789 unconstitutional because the Constitution did not expressly grant this power to the judiciary.   In deciding the constitutionality of an act of Congress, Marshall established judicial review, the most significant development in the history of the Supreme Court.

Impeachment of Samuel Chase

Among the repercussions of the repeal of the Judiciary Act was the first and, to date, only impeachment of a sitting Supreme Court Justice, Samuel Chase. Chase, a Federalist appointed to the Supreme Court by George Washington, had publicly attacked the repeal in May 1803 while issuing his charge to a grand jury in Baltimore, Maryland: "The late alteration of the federal judiciary ... will take away all security for property and personal liberty, and our Republican constitution will sink into a mobocracy, the worst of all popular governments." Jefferson responded to the attack by suggesting to his supporters in the U.S. House of Representatives that Chase be impeached, asking, "Ought the seditious and official attack on the principles of our Constitution . . .to go unpunished?" The House took Jefferson's suggestion, impeaching Chase in 1804. He was acquitted by the Senate of all charges in March 1805, with Vice President Aaron Burr presiding.

Federal question jurisdiction
The repeal of the Judiciary Act also ended the brief period of comprehensive federal-question jurisdiction. The federal courts would not receive such jurisdiction again until 1875.

See also
 Midnight regulations, related term
 Stuart v. Laird (1803)

References

Further reading
 James M. O'Fallon, "The Case of Benjamin Moore: A Lost Episode in the Struggle over Repeal of the 1801 Judiciary Act", 11  43 (1993).

1801 in American law
6th United States Congress
History of the Supreme Court of the United States
United States federal judiciary legislation